Paras is a populated place in Panarukan, a district of Situbondo Regency, East Java on the island of Java, Indonesia.

References

Populated places in East Java